At The Movies is the ninth album from jazz vocalist Gary Williams. Recorded at Kenilworth Studios in 2017, the album was originally intended to feature only Disney songs but was later expanded to cover songs from the movies. It was recorded with full big band and a jazz combo.

The London Evening Standard awarded the album four stars saying, "This selection of movie tunes sung with Sinatra-esque flair, will transport you down memory lane and get your serotonin levels soaring."

Musical Theatre Review said, "He has such a beautiful voice – just like black velvet and, although the style is not completely to my liking (jazz-orientated) there is something about his voice that is completely mesmerising."

New York's Cabaret Scene's magazine said, "This is one of those perfect, easy-listening albums, excellent for relaxing to after a day at work, or serving as background music at a dinner party."

Track listing

Personnel 
Performers
 Gary Williams – vocals
 Matt Regan and Clive Dunstall – piano
 Joe Pettitt – bass
 Elliott Henshaw – drums
 Nigel Price – guitar
 Malcolm Melling – trumpet
 Graeme Blevins – saxes/flute
 Adrian Revell – reeds
 Chris Traves – trombone and percussion
 Angela Barnes – French horn
 Anthony Kerr – vibes
 Producer and Studio Engineer: Chris Traves
 Executive Producer: Gary Williams
 Arrangers: Phil Steel (tracks 1, 2, 3, 4, 6, 7, 8, 9, 10, 11, 14, 15 – horns; Caleb Collins (tracks 5, 15); Chris Traves (track 8 – trombones); Paul Campbell (track 12); David Carter (track 13)

References

External links 
 Official Gary Williams web site: At The Movies

2017 albums
Gary Williams (singer) albums